Bitch Hug is a 2012 Swedish drama film directed by Andreas Öhman. It stars Linda Molin as Kristin, and Fanny Ketter as Andrea, as the main characters. The movie was filmed in the Sundsvall fjord area in 2011.

Plot 
Kristin is an 18-year-old girl who wrote for her school newspaper. She has a list of a thousand things she wishes to do before she dies, and to visit New York City as the first on the list. Kristin has a rocky relationship with her sister Linn, with Linn telling Kristin that Kristin is pathetic with no talent.

After graduating gymasium, Kristin is given an assignment to report on her upcoming trip to New York. The night prior the flight, she attended a graduation party with her schoolmates, where she met Gustav. They then went to Gustav's house in the woods to have sex, but were interrupted when Gustav's little brother asked to be tucked in. With the night ruined, Kristin explores the house, where she meets Gustav's sister Andrea, a 16-year old coming back from her nightly run through the woods. Kristin and Andrea then get to chatting, while laying back and drinking strong alcohol. Andrea convinces Kristin to watch "half a movie", since Kristin must go to New York in two hours. Nonetheless, they both sleep in during the entire movie, and Gustav unwittingly shut off Kristin's alarm on her phone. Panicked, she rushed to the airport to no avail, and comes back to Andrea angry, blaming her for the delay. Kristin tries to reschedule her ticket, but the airline could only book her on another flight if another passenger cancels their reservations.

Kristin initially goes back home, but realizing that all her acquaintances believe she's on her way to New York, she asks Andrea if she could hide in her house. During the house tour, finding a room for Kristin to stay in, Kristin jokes to Andrea next to the swimming pool that Andrea and Gustav, and their parents, had sex in the pool. In anger, Andrea pushed kristin in the pool, where Kristin reveals her inability to swim. Andrea finally gives the attic for Kristin, despite having the master bedroom vacant and having a hole in the roof. Andrea explains that their parents are away on a trip. In the meanwhile, under pressure from the newspaper to publish her trip's experiences, she must fake her trip to New York with Andrea's help. During Kristin's stay in the house, they befriend each other.

During the "trip", Kristin sets out with Andrea and Gustav to accomplish some of the 1000 activities on her list. Kristin and Andrea stay out for too long, so Gustav had to skip his shift at work to care for their little brother. After Kristin complained that their parents are incompetent for leaving them alone for themselves, Gustav explains that their parents are dead. The next night, when Andrea believed everyone was asleep, she ran through her usual route to a cliff overlooking the city and the fjord. Unbeknownst to her until the cliff, Kristin chased Andrea and asked her to tell her everything so she'd share her own secrets. Andrea confesses that she's an orphan and she quit school due to the unwanted attention, complaining that no one really knows a person's true feelings but one's self.

When Gustav hosts a midsummer party with his friends at his place, Kristin and Andrea hide in the attic and have a little party for themselves. However, Linn is present in the party, and bumps into Andrea when Andrea had to visit the kitchen for a while. Andrea runs up to the attic to Kristin, fearing Linn may have recognized her from a video chat as the French exchange student Kristin is "staying with" in New York. They escape the house through the hole in the roof, and hang out by the fjord. When Andrea and Kristin hear the party approaching the pier they're sitting on, Kristin realizes she has nowhere to hide, and tries to swim away through the fjord. Having only had a few swimming lessons with Andrea, she drowns but is swiftly rescued by Andrea.

Word spreads that the entire trip to New York was a hoax, with rumors spreading that she had to live off the earth and that she attempted suicide by drowning after being caught. The editor-in-chief of the newspaper Kristin was writing for forgives the incident, telling her that the controversy helped them sell much more copies, and that he wants Kristin to write about her lie, and to write again about a real trip. He then gives her a flight ticket to New York. During this entire time, Andrea's and Kristin's friendship is strained.

Kristin's friends held a surprise welcome home/farewell party for her after she was released from hospital. Despite not being in the mood for a party, she is coerced by her friends to stay. Andrea visits the party, expecting to get back on good terms with Kristin, but Kristin reverted to her former apathetic self before meeting Andrea.  In grief, Andrea and Kristin get extremely drunk, and Andrea pulls Kristin's ex-boyfriend into the bathroom to have sex with her. Upon realizing the situation, Andrea pushes him off her, and runs out of the party. Kristin chases her and attempts to explain her behavior, and bursts out that their experience wasn't real. Andrea takes this as their relationship meant nothing to Kristin. Devastated, Kristin returns to the party and Andrea is picked up by Gustav while she states that she wishes to resume her education.

In an attempt to fix their relationship, Kristin buys a window to cover the hole on the roof of the attic, and hands Andrea her diary. They get back on friendly terms. Kristin explains that she doesn't wish to visit New York anymore, since it doesn't feel sincere and real anymore, having had the experience with Andrea already. Despite this, Andrea convinces Kristin to fly anyway.

The next day, Kristin boards the flight to New York, Andrea watches the plane take off and looks back to not see Kristin coming up the escalator again.

Cast 
 Linda Molin - Kristin
 Fanny Ketter - Andrea
 Mathilda von Essen - Linn
 Adam Lundgren - Gustav
Antoni Norén Almén - Arthur, Kristin's ex-boyfriend. Their relationship was awkward and intended to be short.
Fabian Fourén - Neo, Gustav and Andrea's little brother.

References

External links 

2012 drama films
2012 films
Swedish drama films
2010s Swedish-language films
Films directed by Andreas Öhman
2010s Swedish films